Ituri District, later Kibali-Ituri District, was a district of the Belgian Congo and the Democratic Republic of the Congo. It roughly corresponded in area to the present Ituri Province.

Belgian Congo

Ituri District was created by an arrêté royal of 28 March 1912, which divided the Congo into 22 districts.
It was named after the Ituri River.
A 1912 map shows that the former Stanleyville District had been broken into a much smaller Stanleyville Districts and the new districts of Lowa, Ituri, Kivu and Maniema.
Ituri District bordered British territory to the east, Haut-Uele District to the north, Stanleyville District to the west and Kivu District to the south.
Ituri District became part of the Orientale Province created in 1913.

With the 1933 reorganization Orientale Province was divided into Stanleyville Province in the north and Costermansville Province in the south.
Ituri District was part of Stanleyville Province. It had been expanded to take part of Haut-Uele District, while the rest of Haut-Uele District and Bas-Uele District had been merged into Uele District.

On 27 May 1947 Stanleyville Province was renamed Orientale Province.
By 1954 it consisted of the districts of Stanleyville, Ituri, Bas-Uele and Haut-Uele.
A 1955–1957 map shows Ituri District bordered by Haut-Uele District to the north, British territory to the east, Nord-Kivu District to the south and Stanleyville District to the west.

Post-Independence

On 27 July 1962 the administration of Orientale Province was taken over by the central government.
It was divided into the new provinces of Kibali-Ituri, Uélé and Haut-Congo.
On 28 December 1966 Orientale Province was reunited.
On 11 July 2015 it was split into provinces of Bas-Uélé, Haut-Uélé, Ituri, and Tshopo.

Maps

See also
Ituri Interim Administration
Districts of the Belgian Congo
Districts of the Democratic Republic of the Congo

References

Sources

Districts of the Belgian Congo
Districts of Orientale Province